Think Like a Man is a 2012 American romantic comedy film directed by Tim Story, written by Keith Merryman and David A. Newman, and produced by Will Packer. It was based on Steve Harvey's 2009 book Act Like a Lady, Think Like a Man. The film stars an ensemble cast, featuring Michael Ealy, Jerry Ferrara, Meagan Good, Regina Hall, Kevin Hart, Terrence J, Taraji P. Henson, Romany Malco, and Gabrielle Union.

The film was released on April 20, 2012 by Screen Gems. It received mixed reviews from critics, who complimented the film's humor, its soundtrack and the performances of the cast (particularly those of Good, Malco and Hart) but received criticism for being a "standard romcom". The film was a commercial success, grossing $96.1 million against a $12 million budget. A direct sequel, Think Like a Man Too, was released on June 20, 2014, with the original cast returning, to negative reviews from critics but become a moderate commercial success.

Plot
The film follows four storylines, which each focus on one particular couple. They are titled:

 "The Mama's Boy" vs. "The Single Mom"
 "The Non-Committer" vs. "The Girl Who Wants the Ring"
 "The Dreamer" vs. "The Woman Who Is Her Own Man"
 "The Player" vs. "The 90 Day Rule Girl"

Each of the women are readers of Steve Harvey's book Act Like a Lady, Think Like a Man. When the men learn that the women are reliant on Harvey's advice, they try to turn the tables on their mates, which later seems to backfire.

Cast

 Kevin Hart as Cedric, "The Happier Divorced Guy"
 Michael Ealy as Dominic, "The Dreamer"
 Taraji P. Henson as Lauren Harris, "The Woman Who Is Her Own Man"
 Terrence J as Michael Hanover, "The Mama's Boy"
 Regina Hall as Candace Hall, "The Single Mom"
 Jerry Ferrara as Jeremy Kern, "The Non-Committer"
 Gabrielle Union as Kristen, "The Girl Who Wants the Ring"
 Romany Malco as Zeke Freeman, "The Player"
 Meagan Good as Mya, "The 90 Day Rule Girl"
 Steve Harvey as himself
 Gary Owen as Bennett, "The Happily Married Man"
 Wendy Williams as Gail, Cedric's ex-wife
 Chris Brown as Alex, Mya's ex
 Keri Hilson as Heather
 Jenifer Lewis as Loretta Hanover, Michael's mom
 La La Anthony as Sonia, Mya's friend
 Caleel Harris as Duke, Candace's son
 Morris Chestnut as James Merrill, Lauren's ex
 Arielle Kebbel as Gina, Kristen's friend
 Kelly Rowland as Brenda
 Sherri Shepherd as Vicki
 Tika Sumpter as Dominic's girlfriend
 Tony Rock as Xavier, Zeke's friend
 Luenell as Aunt Winnie Hall
 Jessica Camacho as Melissa
 Zach Firtel as Ryan, "The Lingerer"
 Matt Colton as Uncle Jesse, "The Ripper"
 Hayden Fein as Ash, "The Trainer"
 Andrew Ward as Runner, "The Cat"
 J. Anthony Brown as Deacon Johnson

Six professional basketball players made cameo appearances as themselves:
 Matt Barnes
 Shannon Brown
 Rasual Butler
 Darren Collison
 Lisa Leslie
 Metta World Peace

Reception

Critical response
The review aggregator website Rotten Tomatoes reported an approval rating of 54% with an average score of 5.1/10, based on 102 reviews. The website's critical consensus reads, "In Think Like a Man, an otherwise standard rom-com is partially elevated by a committed -- and attractive -- cast, resulting in a funny take on modern romance."  Metacritic, which uses a weighted average, assigned the film a score of 51 out of 100 based on 30 critics, indicating "mixed or average reviews".

Roger Ebert of the Chicago Sun-Times wrote that a major problem with the film is that it takes seriously the advice given in the book it is based upon, commenting that such an approach "might have worked as a screwball comedy or a satire, but can you believe for a moment in characters naive enough to actually live their lives following Steve Harvey's advice? The result is a tiresome exercise that circles at great length through various prefabricated stories defined by the advice each couple needs (or doesn't need)." Ebert called the cast "superb" noting in particular the performances of Meagan Good and Kevin Hart. Owen Gleiberman of Entertainment Weekly also complimented Good and Hart's performance, as well as Romany Malco's performance. He ultimately gave the film a "B-" grade, writing that it is "so busy tracking courtship as if it were a science project that the bite-size love stories lack spontaneity." In a positive review, Michael Phillips of the Chicago Tribune commended the film for "stick[ing] to a formula without falling prey to it" and commented that "its hangout factor is considerable, because the actors' charms are considerable."

Box office
Think Like a Man grossed over $33.7 million during its opening weekend, an accomplishment which ended The Hunger Games four-week run at the #1 spot at the U.S. box office. The film remained on atop the competition during its second week, bringing in $17.6 million.

As of June 24, 2012, Think Like a Man has earned $91,547,205 in both the United States and Canada, along with $4,523,302 in other countries, for a worldwide total of $96,070,507 on a production budget of $12.5 million.

Soundtrack
The film's soundtrack includes songs performed by numerous artists, including Kelly Rowland, Jennifer Hudson, Keri Hilson, John Legend and Future.

Production
Principal photography began On July 1, 2011 in Los Angeles, California & Culver City, California and ended on 5 September 2011.

See also
List of black films of the 2010s

References

External links
 
 
 
 
 
 

2012 films
2012 romantic comedy films
African-American films
American independent films
American romantic comedy films
2010s English-language films
Films about interracial romance
Films set in Los Angeles
Films directed by Tim Story
Films produced by Will Packer
Films scored by Christopher Lennertz
Rainforest Films films
Screen Gems films
Films based on non-fiction books
2010s American films